Wilhelm Uhde (28 October 1874, Friedeberg, Province of Brandenburg (now Poland) – 17 August 1947, Paris) was a German art collector, dealer, author and critic, an early collector of modernist painting, and a significant figure in the career of Henri Rousseau.

Biography

Born into a Jewish family, Uhde studied law in Dresden but switched to art history, studying in Munich and Florence before moving to Paris in 1904. He purchased his first Picasso in 1905, and was one of the first collectors of the Cubist paintings of Pablo Picasso and Georges Braque. He met Robert Delaunay, Sonia Terk and Henri Rousseau in 1907, and opened his art gallery in 1908, rue Notre-Dame-des-Champs (Paris) where he exhibited Georges Braque, Jean Metzinger, Sonia Delaunay, André Derain, Raoul Dufy, Auguste Herbin, Jules Pascin and Pablo Picasso. Uhde commissioned Picasso to paint his portrait (1910) and produced the first monograph on Rousseau in 1911.

Uhde and Sonia Terk married in 1908 (London), reportedly a marriage of convenience which masked his homosexuality. They divorced 1910 and Terk married Robert Delaunay.

At the outbreak of World War I, many German nationals living in France had their possessions sequestered by the French state. As a result, Uhde's collection (including works by Georges Braque, Raoul Dufy, Juan Gris, Auguste Herbin, Marie Laurencin, Fernand Léger, Jean Metzinger, Pablo Picasso, Jean Puy and Henri Rousseau) was confiscated in 1914 and sold by the government in a series of auctions at the Hôtel Drouot in 1921.

From 1919–1920, Uhde worked with Helmut Kolle and lived with him in Chantilly, France. Uhde became active as a pacifist in Weimar Germany, but returned to France in 1924, moving back to Chantilly in 1927. A Jew, he spent the Second World War in hiding in southern France, at one point helped by the art critic and resistance leader Jean Cassou.

The Sacred Heart painters
Uhde is also known as the principal organiser of the first Naive Art exhibition, which took place in Paris in 1928. The participants were Henri Rousseau, André Bauchant, Camille Bombois, Séraphine Louis and Louis Vivin, known collectively as the Sacred Heart painters. Séraphine Louis had been Uhde's housecleaner, whose work he had discovered and sponsored from 1912 to 1930.

Writings
Picasso et la tradition française, Paris : Les Quatre Chemins, 1928
Cinq maîtres primitifs, Paris, 1949
Von Bismarck bis Picasso: Erinnerungen und Bekenntnisse (1938) recent editions:

Legacy
A significant part of Uhde's life story is told in the 2008 French film Séraphine by director Martin Provost, focusing on the encounter and subsequent role of Séraphine Louis in his life and he in hers. The film won seven César Awards, including Best Film.

Works from the collection of Wilhelm Uhde

References

1874 births
1947 deaths
People from Strzelce-Drezdenko County
People from the Province of Brandenburg
German art critics
19th-century German Jews
German art collectors
French art collectors
19th-century art collectors
20th-century art collectors
Jewish art collectors
Naïve art
Modern art
Emigrants from the German Empire to France